KGLN (980 AM) is a radio station  broadcasting a news/talk format. Licensed to Glenwood Springs, Colorado, United States, the station is owned by MBC Grand Broadcasting.

On November 27, 2007, Colorado West Broadcasting, Inc. sold KGLN to current owner MBC Broadcasting for $250,000.

References

External links

GLN
News and talk radio stations in the United States